Lalila may refer to:

Characters
Lalila, a character the novel Hadon of Ancient Opar by Philip José Farmer
Lalila, a character in the Mouk TV series

People
Lalila El Basiouny ranked 37 for Egypt at the 2011 World Aquatics Championships

See also
Leila (name)